Mill Creek Wildlife Management Area is  of steeply forested woodlands located near Milton, West Virginia in Cabell County. Mill Creek WMA can be accessed from Johns Creek Road about three miles north from the Milton exit of I-64.

Hunting and wildlife viewing

Hunting opportunities include deer, fox, grouse, rabbit, raccoon, squirrel.

Camping is not available in the WMA.  Camping is available at nearby Fox Fire Resort.

See also

Animal conservation
Hunting
List of West Virginia wildlife management areas

References

External links
West Virginia DNR District 5 Wildlife Management Areas
West Virginia Hunting Regulations
West Virginia Fishing Regulations

Wildlife management areas of West Virginia
Protected areas of Cabell County, West Virginia
IUCN Category V